Yangping could refer to the following locations in China:

Yangping, Hebei (羊平镇), town in Quyang County
Yangping, Yuan'an County (洋坪镇), town in Hubei
Yangping Township (阳坪乡), Kelan County, Shanxi

Towns written as "阳平镇":
Yangping, Henan, in Lingbao, Henan
Yangping, Xiaogan, in Dawu County, Hubei
Yangping, Shaanxi, in Chencang District, Baoji